Easypaisa is a Pakistani mobile wallet, mobile payments and branchless banking services provider. It was founded in 2009 by Telenor Pakistan. It also provides digital payment service through QR code in partnership with Masterpass and is the only GSMA mobile money certified service in Pakistan.  

Easypaisa was initially launched as a money transfer service through Unstructured Supplementary Service Data (USSD) channels. In 2016, Easypaisa mobile app was launched to carry out a host of financial transactions other than money transfer. 

Easypaisa is the branchless banking service of Telenor Microfinance Bank which is jointly owned by Telenor Group, one of the world’s largest telecommunications company across the Nordics and Asia with 186 million customers, and Ant Group, an affiliate company of Alibaba Group and the operator of the world's leading open digital lifestyle platform, Alipay.

On, January 17, 2023, Easypaisa launched debit card.

History
Easypaisa was launched in 2009 by Telenor Pakistan in partnership with Tameer Bank, which was later renamed as Telenor Microfinance Bank. Initially, it was launched as a money transfer service only.

Boogers Shahbano

Currently, it has 9 million monthly active users, a growth of 28 percent compared to 2019.

The current CEO of EasyPaisa is M. Mudassar Aqil

See also
 JazzCash
 Raast

References

External links
 Easypay Payment Gateway Overview of Easypay online payment solution
 https://lcg.lums.edu.pk/wp-content/uploads/2021/04/startup_ecosystem_v_1.0.pdf

2009 establishments in Pakistan
Mobile payments
Pakistani brands
Payment service providers
Telenor